Port Mellon is a settlement in British Columbia  and part of West Howe Sound, Electoral Area F within the Sunshine Coast Regional District (SCRD) in British Columbia, Canada.  Port Mellon is the home to the biggest employer of the area, the Howe Sound Pulp and Paper Mill. Most amenities of the area are a short drive away in Gibsons. For longer trips there is the Langdale ferry terminal to Vancouver.
Nearby Tetrahedron Provincial Park is a popular location for day hikes and mountain biking.

It was named for Captain Henry Augustus Mellon who came to Vancouver in 1886.

References

External links
 Howe Sound Pulp and Paper Corporation

Settlements in British Columbia
Populated places in the Sunshine Coast Regional District